American Gypsies is an American reality television series on National Geographic Channel. The series debuted on July 17, 2012, and follows the family of John, a Gypsy family in New York City.

Plot

Is about a Roma family that are in a fight to keep their culture.

Episodes

See also
 My Big Fat American Gypsy Wedding, which aired from 2012 to 2016

References

2010s American reality television series
2012 American television series debuts
2012 American television series endings
English-language television shows
National Geographic (American TV channel) original programming
Romani mass media
Television shows filmed in New York (state)
Romani in the United States